Leif Hartwig (born 9 November 1942) is a Danish former footballer who played as a defender. He made 17 appearances for the Denmark national team from 1964 to 1966.

References

External links
 

1942 births
Living people
Footballers from Odense
Danish men's footballers
Association football defenders
Denmark international footballers
Boldklubben 1909 players